A developed country (or industrialized country, high-income country, more economically developed country (MEDC), advanced country) is a sovereign state that has a high quality of life, developed economy, and advanced technological infrastructure relative to other less industrialized nations. Most commonly, the criteria for evaluating the degree of economic development are gross domestic product (GDP), gross national product (GNP), the per capita income, level of industrialization, amount of widespread infrastructure and general standard of living. Which criteria are to be used and which countries can be classified as being developed are subjects of debate. Different definitions of developed countries are provided by the International Monetary Fund and the World Bank; moreover, HDI ranking is used to reflect the composite index of life expectancy, education, and income per capita. Another commonly used measure of a developed country is the threshold of GDP (PPP) per capita of at least USD$22,000. In 2022, 36 countries fit all four criteria, while an additional 17 countries fit three out of four.

Developed countries have generally more advanced post-industrial economies, meaning the service sector provides more wealth than the industrial sector. They are contrasted with developing countries, which are in the process of industrialisation or are pre-industrial and almost entirely agrarian, some of which might fall into the category of Least Developed Countries. As of 2015, advanced economies comprise 60.8% of global GDP based on nominal values and 42.9% of global GDP based on purchasing-power parity (PPP) according to the IMF.

Definition and criteria 

Economic criteria have tended to dominate discussions. One such criterion is the income per capita; countries with the high gross domestic product (GDP) per capita would thus be described as developed countries. Another economic criterion is industrialisation; countries in which the tertiary and quaternary sectors of industry dominate would thus be described as developed. More recently, another measure, the Human Development Index (HDI), which combines an economic measure, national income, with other measures, indices for life expectancy and education has become prominent. This criterion would define developed countries as those with a very high (HDI) rating. The index, however, does not take into account several factors, such as the net wealth per capita or the relative quality of goods in a country. This situation tends to lower the ranking of some of the most advanced countries, such as the G7 members and others.

According to the United Nations Statistics Division:
There is no established convention for the designation of "developed" and "developing" countries or areas in the United Nations system.

And it notes that:
The designations "developed" and "developing" are intended for statistical convenience and do not necessarily express a judgement about the stage reached by a particular country or area in the development process.

Nevertheless, the United Nations Conference on Trade and Development considers that this categorization can continue to be applied:
The developed economies broadly comprise Northern America and Europe, Israel, Japan and the Republic of Korea, as well as Australia and New Zealand.

Similar terms 

Terms linked to the concept developed country include "advanced country", "industrialized country", "'more developed country" (MDC), "more economically developed country" (MEDC), "Global North country", "first world country", and "post-industrial country". The term industrialized country may be somewhat ambiguous, as industrialisation is an ongoing process that is hard to define. The first industrialized country was the United Kingdom, followed by Belgium. Later it spread further to Germany, United States, France and other Western European countries. According to some economists such as Jeffrey Sachs, however, the current divide between the developed and developing world is largely a phenomenon of the 20th century.

Mathis Wackernagel calls the binary labeling of countries as "neither descriptive nor explanatory. It is merely a thoughtless and destructive endorsement of GDP fetish. In reality, there are not two types of countries, but over 200 countries, all faced with the same laws of nature, yet each with unique features."

A 2021 analysis proposes the term emerged to describe markets, economies, or countries that have graduated from emerging market status, but have not yet reached the level equivalent to developed countries. Multinational corporations from these emerging markets present unique patterns of overseas expansion and knowledge acquisition from foreign countries.

Economy lists by various criteria

Human Development Index (HDI) 

The UN HDI is a statistical measure that gauges an economy's level of human development. While there is a strong correlation between having a high HDI score and being a prosperous economy, the UN points out that the HDI accounts for more than income or productivity. Unlike GDP per capita or per capita income, the HDI takes into account how income is turned "into education and health opportunities and therefore into higher levels of human development."

Since 1990, Norway (2001–2006, 2009–2019), Japan (1990–1991 and 1993), Canada (1992 and 1994–2000) and Iceland (2007–2008) have had the highest HDI score.

The following countries ranked from 1 to 66 in the year 2021 are considered to be of "very high human development":

High-income economies 

Some institutions have produced lists of developed countries: the UN (list shown above), the CIA, and some providers of stock market indices (the FTSE Group, MSCI, S&P, Dow Jones, STOXX, etc.). The latter is not included here because its association of developed countries with countries with both high incomes and developed markets is not deemed as directly relevant.

However, many other institutions have created more general lists referred to when discussing developed countries. For example, the International Monetary Fund (IMF) identifies 39 "advanced economies". The OECD's 37 members are known as the "developed countries club". The World Bank identifies 81 "high income countries". Other standards, such as the 30-50 Club (GDP per capita over $30,000 and population over 50 million) have been developed to categorize highly developed and influential countries.

World Bank high-income economies 

According to the World Bank the following 80 countries and territories are classified as "high-income economies". As of the 2022 fiscal year, high-income economies are those that had a GNI per capita of $12,696 or more in 2020.

36 countries and territories in Europe:

20 countries and territories in the Americas:

15 countries and territories in Asia:

eight countries and territories in Oceania:

one country in Africa:

nine former high-income economies:

# Dissolved on 10 October 2010, succeeded by Curaçao and Sint Maarten.

High-income OECD members 
According to the World Bank, the following 34 members are classified as "OECD High-Income":

26 countries in Europe:

three countries in the Americas:

three countries in Asia:

two countries in Oceania:

Development Assistance Committee members 

There are 29 OECD member countries and the European Union—in the Development Assistance Committee (DAC), a group of the world's major donor countries that discuss issues surrounding development aid and poverty reduction in developing countries. The following OECD member countries are DAC members:

23 countries in Europe:

two countries in the Americas:

two countries in Asia:

two countries in Oceania:

IMF advanced economies 

According to the International Monetary Fund, 40 countries and territories are officially listed as "advanced economies", with the addition of 7 microstates and dependencies modified by the CIA which were omitted from the IMF version:

28 countries and dependencies in Europe classified by the IMF, 6 others given by the CIA:

seven countries and territories in Asia:

three countries and territories in the Americas classified by the IMF, one territory given by the CIA :

two countries in Oceania:

d The CIA has modified an older version of the IMF's list of 38 Advanced Economies, noting that the IMF's Advanced Economies list "would presumably also cover the following nine smaller countries of Andorra, Bermuda, Faroe Islands, Guernsey, Holy See, Jersey, Liechtenstein, Monaco, and San Marino[...]". San Marino (2012) and Andorra (2021) were later included in the IMF's list.

Paris Club members 

There are 22 permanent members in the Paris Club, a group of officials from major creditor countries whose role is to find coordinated and sustainable solutions to the payment difficulties experienced by debtor countries.

15 countries in Europe:

three countries in the Americas:

three countries in Asia:

one country in Oceania:

Comparative table (2022) 
Comparative table of countries with a "very high" human development (0.800 or higher), according to UNDP; "advanced" economies, according to the IMF; "high income" economies, according to the World Bank; and income per capita (purchasing power parity) higher than $25,000, according to the IMF.

See also 

 Digital divide
 First World privilege
 First World problem
 Fourth World
 Globalization
 G8
 G7
 List of countries by wealth per adult
 Multinational corporation
 Western Bloc

Notes

References

External links 
 
 IMF (advanced economies)
 The World Factbook  (developed countries)
 United Nations Statistics Division (definition)
 List of countries, United Nations Statistics Division (developed regions)
 World Bank (high-income economies)

Economic country classifications
Human geography
Economic geography
Country
Lists of countries
Imperialism studies